The TVyNovelas Award for Best Actress in a Drama Series is presented annually by Televisa and the magazine TVyNovelas to honor the best Mexican television productions, including telenovelas. The award ceremony rotates between Mexico City and Acapulco.

Winners and nominees

2010s

2020s

References

External links 

Premios TVyNovelas
TVyNovelas Awards
Television awards for Best Actress
Mexican television awards